Sri Lanka took part in the 2018 Asian Para Games which was held in Jakarta from 6 to 13 October 2018, sent a delegation consisting of 30 para-athletes in 9 different sporting events. The 2016 Rio Paralympic medalist Dinesh Priyantha Herath was the skipper and the flagbearer for the contingent. Sri Lanka secured 5 medals on the opening day of the Asian Para Games.

Sri Lanka claimed 13 medals solely in the event of para-athletics during the competition including 4 gold medals and finished at 14th position out of 43 nations. Sri Lanka also secured all three medals across two tracks and field events during the competition, which was the first-ever instance in Sri Lankan sports history.

Sri Lankan skipper Dinesh Priyantha set a new Asian Para Games record in a javelin throw of 61.84m to secure a gold medal in the men's F46 javelin throw event. Amila Prashan also set a new Asian Para Games record by clocking with a timing of 12.56 seconds to clinch gold in the men's 100m T42/63 category. In July 2019, it is announced that Sri Lanka had a silver upgraded to gold and an extra bronze medal from medal reallocation due to a doping violation of an Uzbek athlete.

Medalists

Medals by sport

Medals by day

See also 
Sri Lanka at the 2018 Asian Games

References 

2018
Asian Para Games
Nations at the 2018 Asian Para Games